Didier Chouat (24 April 1945 –  20 November 2014) was a French politician who served as a member of the National Assembly.

Political career 
Chouat served 3 separate terms as MP for Côtes-d'Armor's 3rd constituency.

Personal life 
His brother Francis Chouat is also an MP.

References 

1945 births
2014 deaths
Politicians from Paris
Mayors of places in Brittany
Socialist Party (France) politicians
Deputies of the 7th National Assembly of the French Fifth Republic
Deputies of the 8th National Assembly of the French Fifth Republic
Deputies of the 9th National Assembly of the French Fifth Republic
Deputies of the 11th National Assembly of the French Fifth Republic